Colonel HH Maharaja Sir Yadvendra Singh Judeo Bahadur, K.C.S.I., K.C.I.E. (31 January 1893 – 4 August 1963) was Born in Bundela Rajput Family Of Panna. He was the 13th Maharaja of Panna State from years 1902 - 1947 and official Maharaja of Panna from 1947 till his death in 1963. He was awarded Kaiser-i-Hind Medal in 1916 and made Knight Commander of the Order of the Indian Empire (KCIE) in the 1922 New Year Honours .

He acceded his State in to Union of India on 1 January 1950. He was appointed Uparajpramukh of Vindhya Pradesh after the merger of his state into the Indian Republic. He also served as president of Akhil Bharatiya Kshatriya Mahasabha in 1946.

References

1893 births
1963 deaths
Rajpramukhs
Indian royalty
Recipients of the Kaisar-i-Hind Medal
Knights Commander of the Order of the Indian Empire
Knights Commander of the Order of the Star of India